The Bethlehem-Center School District is a small, rural, public school district located in the unincorporated Village of Fredericktown, Pennsylvania. It is one of fourteen school districts in Washington County, Pennsylvania.  It encompasses approximately  serving the Boroughs of Beallsville, Centerville, Deemston and Marianna and East Bethlehem Township and West Bethlehem Township.  The district operates three schools. According to 2000 federal census data, it serves a resident population of 9,292. In 2009 the district residents' per capita income was $15,236, while the median family income was $37,302.

Schools
Bethlehem-Center High School (9th–12th)
Bethlehem-Center Middle School (6th–8th)
Bethlehem-Center Elementary School (K–5th)

Extracurriculars
The district offers a variety of clubs, activities and sports. The district offers students many sports, including boys' varsity football, boys' varsity basketball, baseball, boys JV football, girls varsity basketball, softball, boys' middle school football, boys' middle school basketball, middle school softball, girls' varsity volleyball, varsity wrestling, track, boys' varsity soccer, middle school wrestling, girls' varsity soccer, golf, girls' middle school basketball.

References

External links
 

School districts in Washington County, Pennsylvania